Taikkala is an ancient historical site, located in Mon State, Myanmar.

References

Bibliography
 

Mon State